Autostrada A50, also called tangenziale Ovest di Milano, is a motorway that connects the suburban area of Milan from south-east to north-west, managed by Milano Serravalle – Milano Tangenziali.

By adding the urban sections of A1 and A4, which runs parallel to the northern ring road by connecting A51 and A50, to the three ring roads, a system of urban motorways is obtained that totally surrounds the city. The traffic flow that affects this stretch of highway is around 250,000 daily transits.

References

Buildings and structures completed in 1968
1968 establishments in Italy
A50
Transport in Milan
Ring roads in Italy